Yaşar Doğu (1913 – 8 January 1961) was a renowned Turkish Wrestler, World and Olympic champion in Greco-Roman and Freestyle of Circassian descent.

Biography 
He was born in the village Karlı of Kavak district in Samsun province to a family of Circassian origin. He began wrestling at his age of 15 in yağlı güreş (oil wrestling) and continued in this folk sports until he entered the military service. His sports wrestling career started 1936 in Ankara as he was discovered by the sports wrestler Celal Atik.

Yaşar Doğu was admitted to the national team in 1939. He participated at the European Championships held that year in Oslo, Norway and became silver medalist in Greco-Roman style, his only participation at any international competition missing the gold medal. He became Balkan, European and World champion besides Olympic gold medalist. Yaşar Doğu wrestled 47 times in the national team between 1939 and 1951, of which only one he lost. 33 of his matches he won by near-fall. All his 46 winning matches lasted 372 minutes in total, whereas the normal duration should be 690 minutes. After retiring from the active sports, he served as the trainer of the national team.

He married Hayriye on 15 October 1937. Yaşar Doğu gave the name Gazanfer to one of his sons in admiration to his teammate Gazanfer Bilge. His son Gazanfer Doğu was educated in the US, and became a lecturer of physical education and sports at Abant Izzet Baysal University in Bolu.

Yaşar Doğu suffered a heart attack during the 1955 championships held in Sweden, where he was as the trainer of Turkey's wrestling team. He died on 8 January 1961 in Ankara following a second heart attack.

Achievements
 1939 European Wrestling Championships in Oslo, Norway - silver (Greco-Roman style Lightweight)
 1940 Balkan Wrestling Championships in Istanbul, Turkey - gold (Greco-Roman style Lightweight)
 1946 European Wrestling Championships in Stockholm, Sweden - gold (Freestyle Welterweight)
 1947 European Wrestling Championships in Prague, Czechoslovakia - gold (Greco-Roman style Welterweight)
 1948 Summer Olympics in London, England - gold (Freestyle Welterweight)
 1949 European Wrestling Championships in Istanbul, Turkey - gold (Freestyle Middleweight)
 1951 World Wrestling Championships in Helsinki, Finland - gold (Freestyle Light heavyweight)

Legacy
 Yaşar Doğu Sports Hall, 1966-built venue with 1,500 seating capacity in downtown Samsun
 Yaşar Doğu Wrestling Hall, 1989-built wrestling designated venue for 250 spectators in Samsun
 Tekkeköy Yaşar Doğu Arena, 7,500-seat multi-purpose indoor venue  in Tekkeköy district of Samsun Province opened end March 2013

References

External links
 

1913 births
1961 deaths
People from Kavak, Samsun
Turkish people of Ubykh descent
Olympic wrestlers of Turkey
Wrestlers at the 1948 Summer Olympics
Turkish male sport wrestlers
Olympic gold medalists for Turkey
Olympic medalists in wrestling
Medalists at the 1948 Summer Olympics
Turkish people of Circassian descent